IMS Unison University (IUU), formerly Institute of Management Studies, is a private university located in Dehradun, Uttarakhand, India. It offers academic programs at under-graduate, post-graduate and doctoral levels in different streams of management, mass communication, law, hospitality management and liberal arts.

Academics
It offers academic programs at under-graduate, post-graduate and doctoral levels in different streams through its five schools: Click on Programs.
 School of Management
 School of Law
 School of Media and Communication Design
 School of Hospitality Management
 School of Liberal Arts

Affiliations
Like all private universities in India, IMS Unison University is recognized and approved by the University Grants Commission. Law Programs are approved by the Bar Council of India (BCI).Bar Council Approval  IUU is a member the Association of Indian Universities (AIU).

Cultural festival 
The annual cultural festival of IMS Unison University is called Lamhe. Lamhe is a two to three day event. Notable appearances include Millind Gaba in 2016 and DJ NYK and Ash King in 2017.

Placement advertisements
In June 2016 an advertisement by the IMS Unison University was one of 98 advertisements banned by the Advertising Standards Council of Indias (ASCI) Consumer Complaints Council (CCC), 39 of which belonged to the education category. The ad, claiming "Over 90% Placement consistently in last three years", was banned for being "not substantiated and misleading".

References

External links
 

Private universities in India
Universities in Uttarakhand
Universities and colleges in Dehradun
2013 establishments in Uttarakhand
Educational institutions established in 2013